Operation Blockbuster was the completion of the larger Operation Veritable by the First Canadian Army, reinforced by the XXX Corps from the British Second Army from late February to early March, 1945. Veritable had been slower and more costly than expected and the Canadian commander, General Harry Crerar, had decided on a fresh start for the operation. They linked up with the Ninth US Army at Berendonk, near Geldern on 3 March.

Battle honours
Attached to the 10th Canadian Infantry Brigade, 4th Canadian (Armoured) Division, the Canadian infantry and armoured regiments to earn battle honours for actions during Operation Blockbuster, emblazoned on their regimental colours as The Hochwald, include:
 The Algonquin Regiment
 The Argyll and Sutherland Highlanders of Canada
 The Lake Superior Regiment (Motor)
 The Lincoln and Welland Regiment
 Sherbrooke Fusiliers Regiment 
 South Alberta Regiment
 The South Saskatchewan Regiment

In popular culture
The Battle of the Hochwald Gap was the topic of an episode of the documentary series Greatest Tank Battles. Veterans on both sides gave testimonies on the violence of the campaign. The Canadians in particular spoke of the tenacity of German soldiers in the Rhineland while former German soldiers gave testimonies on their own experiences with the Canadians.

Further reading

External links

 "The Hochwald Gap" at Canadianheroes.org
 Official history of the Canadian Army (Chapter XIX): The Battle of the Rhineland. Part II: Operation "BLOCKBUSTER"

See also 
 Canada in World War II

Footnotes 

Western European Campaign (1944–1945)
Battles of World War II involving Canada
Military operations of World War II involving Germany
Blockbuster